The Battle of the Selle (17–25 October 1918) was a battle between Allied forces and the German Army, fought during the Hundred Days Offensive of World War I.

Prelude

After the Second Battle of Cambrai, the Allies advanced almost  and liberated the French towns of Naves and Thun-Saint-Martin. Although the capture of Cambrai was achieved much sooner than expected and with moderately low casualties, German resistance northeast of the town stiffened along the German Army's final organized defensive structure, the 'Hermann Line'.

By 11 October, the Fourth Army had closed up on the retreating Germans near Le Cateau, with the Germans taking up a new position, immediately to the east of the Selle River. General Henry Rawlinson was faced with three problems: crossing the river, the railway embankment on the far side and the ridge above the embankment. The decision was made to commence the assault at night, and as the river was not very wide at this point, planks would be used for the soldiers to cross in single file. Later, pontoons would be required for the artillery to cross the river. Field Marshal Douglas Haig, aware that the Germans were near exhaustion, initiated a series of operations designed to get British troops in strength across the river and clear a way for a move against the Sambre–Oise Canal, a further  to the east.

Battle
After a six-day halt for preparations and artillery bombardments Fourth Army troops attacked at 5.20 a.m. on Thursday 17 October. Infantry and tanks, preceded by a creeping barrage, moved forward on a  front south of Le Cateau (site of the famous 1914 rearguard). The centre and left of the Fourth Army forced crossings of the river, despite unexpectedly strong German resistance and much uncut barbed wire. Fighting was particularly fierce along the line of the Le Cateau–Wassigny railway. The right of the attack, across the upland watershed of the Selle, made most progress and by nightfall the German defences had been broken and Le Cateau captured. On the left, First Army advanced forward in the area of the Selle's confluence with the Escaut/Scheldt. Here, at the northern edge of the attack front, the Canadian Corps pushed across the Canal de la Sensée on the 18th and captured Denain on the 19th, securing the flank for the push across the Selle. On the 19th alone the Canadian Corps liberated 40 towns and villages that had been occupied since August 1914.

The British Third and First Armies, north of the Fourth Army, maintained the offensive pressure the following day. In a surprise joint night attack in the early morning of 20 October, Third Army formations secured the high ground east of the Selle and, further securing the left flank, the Canadians swept around the city of Valenciennes in the north. Following a two-day pause, to bring up heavy artillery, the attack was renewed on 23 October with a major combined assault by Fourth, Third and First Armies; the fighting, which continued into the next day, resulted in further advances. At this stage, the German Army was retreating at a forced but controlled pace. On 24 October, the German Army counterattacked at the Canal de la Dérivation but were repulsed and pushed back by the Belgian Army.

Aftermath
Lt. Frederick William Hedges was awarded the Victoria Cross for his actions during the battle.

On 26 October, Erich Ludendorff, First Quartermaster General of the German army, resigned under pressure from Kaiser Wilhelm II.

Commemoration
 The actions of the Canadian Corps in the battle are commemorated at the Canadian Bourlon Wood Memorial.

In popular culture
 In the video game Battlefield 1, there is a map called "Giant's Shadow" that is based on the Battle of the Selle. Later in the game's life a weapon skin called "the Selle" was added.

References

 Pursuit of the Selle

External links
 62nd Division's part in the advance.

Battles of the Western Front (World War I)
Canada in World War I
New Zealand in World War I
Battle honours of the Rifle Brigade
Battle honours of the King's Royal Rifle Corps
October 1918 events
1918 in France